Puya secunda is a species in the genus Puya. This species is endemic to Bolivia.

References

secunda
Flora of Bolivia